Thomas "Skip" Chappelle  is an American former college basketball player and coach at the University of Maine.

Playing career
After starring at Old Town High School and leading the school to the 1957 Maine state championship, Chappelle spent a post-graduate year at Maine Central Institute where he was part of its New England Prep Championship squad. He played his college basketball with Maine where he was a three-time All-Yankee Conference selection, and the school's first player to be selected as a Little All-American.

Chappelle was selected by the St. Louis Hawks in the 11th round of the 1962 NBA Draft, becoming the school's first-ever NBA Draft selection.

Coaching career
Chappelle took over his alma mater as head coach in 1971, guiding the Black Bears to a 217–226 record over 17 seasons. During that time, Chappelle coached seven future NBA draft selections, including Rufus Harris, Jeff Cross and Rick Carlisle.

Head coaching record

References 

Year of birth missing (living people)
Living people
American men's basketball players
Basketball coaches from Maine
Basketball players from Maine
College men's basketball head coaches in the United States
Maine Black Bears men's basketball coaches
Maine Black Bears men's basketball players
Maine Central Institute alumni
People from Old Town, Maine
St. Louis Hawks draft picks